The 2015 Chicago Fire season is the club's 20th year of existence, as well as their 18th season in Major League Soccer and their 18th consecutive year in the top-flight of American soccer.

Chicago Fire began the regular season on March 6, 2015 with an away match against the defending champions LA Galaxy. The Men in Red finished the regular season on October 25, 2015 with a home match against the New York Red Bulls.  The club has missed the playoffs for the fifth time in the past six years.

For the first time in the franchise history Chicago Fire opened the season with three consecutive losses.

On September 20, 2015, entrenched in last place both in the conference and overall, with the playoff hopes out of sight, the club parted ways with head coach and director of soccer Frank Yallop and assistant coaches Marc Bircham and Clint Mathis.  In two seasons with the Fire Yallop posted a 13-26-24 record. Fire named the technical director Brian Bliss as interim coach, while the vice president and former player Logan Pause took over as interim assistant coach.  The club also hired Nelson Rodriguez, a former MLS executive, as new general manager.

On October 3, 2015, Ante Razov, the club's all-time leading scorer, became the eighth individual to be inducted into the club's Ring of Fire Hall of Fame.  The ceremony took place during the halftime of the regular season home match against New England Revolution.

On October 14, 2015 Chicago Fire announced the end of a four-year run with the title sponsor Quaker and introduced Valspar as the  sponsor starting with 2016 season.  The three-year deal is worth between $2.5 million and $3 million per year.

For the first time in the club's history Fire finished the season with zero road wins (0-12-5).  The club has finished the season with an overall record of 8 wins, 20 losses and 6 ties.  Twenty losses in a season became the highest in the club's history.  The club has finished the season in last place in the league overall, also another first in the club's history.

Squad at the end of the season 
As of October 25, 2015. Source: Chicago Fire official roster

Player movement

In 

Per Major League Soccer and club policies terms of the deals do not get disclosed.

Out 

 Players selected in 2015 MLS SuperDraft, but ultimately not signed: midfielder Alex Shinsky (68th overall, fourth round, from University of Maryland)
 Trialists released in the preseason: goalkeeper Mark Pais, defender Joachim de Wilde, defender Bryan Gaul (Open Tryout winner), defender Nick Miele, defender Albert Edward, midfielder Franck Songo'o, midfielder Alou Diarra, defender Danny Gabbidon and forward Shahdon Winchester.

Loans 
Per Major League Soccer and club policies terms of the deals do not get disclosed.

In

Out

Technical staff at the end of the season

Standings

Eastern Conference table

Overall table

Results summary

Results

Match results

Preseason 
Kickoff times are in CST (UTC-06)

Simple Invitational

Major League Soccer 

Kickoff times are in CDT (UTC-05), unless posted otherwise

U.S. Open Cup 

Kickoff times are in CDT (UTC-05)

Friendlies 
Kickoff times are in CDT (UTC-05)

Leading scorers 

Italics indicate player who departed the club during the season.
Updated to match played on October 25, 2015.Source: MLSsoccer.com statistics - 2015 Chicago Fire

Appearances and goals

|-
|colspan="14"|Players who left the club during the season: (Statistics shown are the appearances made and goals scored while at Chicago Fire)

Recognition

MLS Player of the Week

MLS Team of the Week

Team annual awards 
Midfielder David Accam was named the Most Valuable Player, as well as was awarded the Golden Boot.  In 23 matches this season Accam scored team-leading ten goals and added two assists.

First-year defender Eric Gehrig was named the Defensive Player of the Year.

David Accam was chosen Section 8 Chicago Supporters' Player of the Year.

Lovel Palmer's left-footed strike from over 30 yards in the U.S. Open Cup Round of 16 win over the Charlotte Independence was named the club's Goal of the Year.

Kits

Primary kit 

According to the league's bi-annual rotation of kits the primary kit carried over from the previous season. It was originally unveiled on March 4, 2014.  The jersey design was inspired by the City of Chicago fire trucks which feature a dark top, a band and red throughout the bottom half.  The light blue represents the primary color of the Chicago flag.

Secondary kit 
On March 2, 2015 Chicago Fire unveiled the club's new secondary kit.  The design and details were inspired by the City of Chicago flag.

Draft pick trades 
Picks acquired:
 2016 MLS SuperDraft third round pick in exchange for goalkeeper Kyle Reynish

Picks traded:
 2015 MLS SuperDraft conditional third round pick, 2014 MLS SuperDraft 8th overall pick and Jalil Anibaba to Seattle Sounders FC in exchange for Jhon Kennedy Hurtado and Patrick Ianni
 2016 MLS SuperDraft conditional pick to Los Angeles Galaxy in exchange for Greg Cochrane
 2016 MLS SuperDraft natural selection second round pick to Orlando City SC in exchange for Eric Gehrig

References

External links 

 

Chicago Fire FC seasons
Chicago Fire Soccer Club
Chicago Fire Soccer Club
Chicago Fire